The 3M Half Marathon presented by Under Armour is an annual half marathon held in Austin, Texas, United States. The 30th annual 3M Half Marathon will take place on January 21, 2024.

The 3M Half Marathon boasts one of the fastest  courses in the country. Runners enjoy a point-to-point course with mostly downhill running. Starting in north Austin and finishing near the Texas State Capitol, the course has a net elevation drop of more than 300 feet. As a result, the event has adapted the tagline “Downhill to Downtown.” Because the net elevation drop exceeds a ration of 1:1,000, times recorded in the race are ineligible for world record consideration and for entry standards in World Athletics events. High Five Events based out of Austin, produces the 3M Half Marathon and the Austin Marathon.

Recognition 
Named “Best Schwag” by Runner’s World in 2008 for legendary goodie bag.

Named “Best Road Race” in 2013 , 2016 , 2017  by AFM Annual "Best Of" Awards.

Named by Runner’s Word as one of The Year’s Best Half Marathons.

Named Austin Race of the Year (15K & longer) by Austin runners in 2007 and 2002.

Selected by Competition Texas magazine as the top half marathon in 2006.

Men's winners

Women's winners

External links

References

Half marathons in the United States
Annual events in Texas
1994 establishments in Texas
Recurring sporting events established in 1994
Sports in Austin, Texas